Ang Pagbabalik ni Pedro Penduko is a 1994 Philippine fantasy comedy film directed by J. Erastheo Navoa. Based on a Philippine comic character created by Francisco V. Coching, the film stars Janno Gibbs as the titular character. It was one of the entries in the 1994 Metro Manila Film Festival.

A sequel Pedro Penduko 2: The Return of the Comeback was released in 2000.

Plot
Pedro Penduko steals a legendary talisman called the Cuatro Vidas from a collector named Abraham. When Abraham tries to get it back, the Cuatro Vidas activates a portal that sucks Pedro, his gay friend Ricky and Abraham to another dimension, where they are captured by militiamen led by Kidlat and his aide, Silahis. Silahis takes a fancy to Ricky and after coming out as gay, convinces the entire militia to return to their colonial-era town dressed in drag. Pedro, with his modern clothes and equipment causes a stir in town, especially when Kidlat's niece Anna, to whom he becomes infatuated with, connects his arrival with that of a prophesied savior that will defeat Losipero, the demonic leader of a group of monsters that has been harassing the town and abducting residents. 

After Anna is abducted by monsters, Pedro sets out to attack Losipero's lair, followed by the townspeople as he battles multiple monsters along the way. Pedro arrives at Losipero's lair just as the latter arises from his slumber. After Pedro frees Anna, Losipero taunts him in battle, disorienting Pedro and making him spew out a stronger and evil version of himself that he eventually defeats after a difficult battle. Abraham arrives and helps Pedro defeat the monsters by using a legendary barbell that turns him into Captain Barbell and giving Anna a white stone that turns her into Darna. Pedro chases Losipero with the help of Flavio until he corners the demon and places the Cuatro Vidas around his neck, killing him. As Pedro, Abraham and Ricky, accompanied by a demanding Silahis, prepare to return to their world, Pedro's girlfriend, Bambi arrives and angrily drags back Pedro to their home dimension after seeing him with Anna. As Pedro patches things up by kissing Bambi, Losipero suddenly appears, only for police officers to arrest him, saying that he is actually a lunatic named Don Robert.

Cast
 Janno Gibbs as Pedro Penduko
 Donita Rose as Bambi
 Arnel Ignacio as Ricky
 Chiquito as Abraham
 Vina Morales as Anna
 Jun Aristorenas as Kidlat
 Rez Cortez as Silahis
 Malou de Guzman as Rosario
 Lester Llansang as Juan
 Danita Paner as Marla
 Ace Espinosa as Cultist
 Cris Daluz as Apo Lakay
 Danny Punzalan as Hunter
 Romy Diaz as Paniki
 Bing Loyzaga as Lucifera
 Leo Martinez as Lucifero
 Beverly Salviejo as Tourist
 Ross Rival as Tourist
 Boy Roque as Centurion
 Bing Angeles as Taong Apoy - Reality
 Robert Miller as Zombie Leader
 Cloyd Robinson as High Priest
 Boots Basi as Dancer
 Jun Madraga as Taong Apoy
 Benny Ching as Taong Apoy
 Jun Veneracion as Priset
 Tito Hilario as Taong Paniki

Guest cast
 Anjanette Abayari as Darna
 Sharon Cuneta as Pawnshop Manager
 Andrew E. as Captain Barbell
 Rudy Fernandez as Bobby Ortega
 Robin Padilla as Binoy
 Fernando Poe Jr. as Flavio

Awards

References

External links

1994 films
1994 fantasy films
Filipino-language films
Philippine fantasy comedy films
Viva Films films